Andrijaševci is a village and a municipality in Vukovar-Syrmia County in eastern Croatia. Despite its name, the seat of the municipality is in the village of Rokovci.

Name
The name of the village in Croatian is plural.

Demographics
With pronounced issue of population decline in eastern Croatia caused by population ageing, effects of the Croatian War of Independence and post 2013 enlargement of the European Union emigration, the population of the municipality at the time of 2021 census dropped to 3,441 from 2011 census that listed a total of 4,075 inhabitants in the municipality's two settlements:

Andrijaševci – 2,046
Rokovci – 2,029

Austro-Hungarian 1910 census

References

External links
 

Populated places in Vukovar-Syrmia County
Municipalities of Croatia
Populated places in Syrmia